Let asfaltového holuba ("Fly of the Asphalt Pigeon") is a 1991 Czechoslovak psychodrama, starring Ondřej Vetchý, Szidi Tobias, Roman Luknár and György Cserhalmi.

The movie directed by Vladimír Balco, brought Vetchý the Golden Nail at the 29th Festival československého filmu as Best Actor in Leading Role. While Vladimír Godár won the award in the Film score category.

Cast
 Ondřej Vetchý as Dodo
 Szidi Tobias as Milena
 Roman Luknár as Zdeno
 György Cserhalmi as Dodo's father 
 Alena Procházková as Dodo's mother
 František Velecký as Fraňo
 Branislav Polák as Kysela
 Vladimír Hajdu as Young man
 Milena Dvorská as Poláková
 Janko Kroner as Dodo (voice role)
 Štefan Kožka as Dodo's father (voice role)

Additional credits
 Ján Svoboda - art director
 Mária Šilberská - costume designer
 Bohumil Martinák - sound
 Peter Breiner - conductor
 Juraj Solan - score mix
 Zuzana Tatarová - script editor

Awards

See also
List of Slovak submissions for the Academy Award for Best Foreign Language Film

References

External links

1991 films
Czechoslovak drama films
Slovak drama films
Slovak-language films